The Rural Municipality of Coldwell is located in the Interlake Region of the province of Manitoba in Western Canada. The principal community within the boundaries is Lundar.

History 
The rural municipality was named for George Robson Coldwell, a member of the provincial legislature from 1907 to 1915. It was incorporated on November 19, 1912.

Communities 
 Clarkleigh
 Lundar
 Lundyville
 Otto
 Vestfold

Government 
The Rural Municipality has a municipal style government with four councillors and one head of council, known as the mayor, as well as a deputy mayor. The four councillors represent the municipality at large. Within the borders of the municipality is the Local Urban District of Lundar, which itself has three councillors.

Members
The council of the Rural Municipality of Coldwell is composed of:
 Mayor: Brian Sigfusson
 Councillor/Deputy Mayor: Virgil Johnson
 Councillor: Greg Brown
 Councillor: Jim Scharf
 Councillor: Kent Kostyshyn

Climate

Demographics 

References

External links
 Official website
 Manitoba Historical Society - Rural Municipality of Coldwell
 Map of Coldwell R.M. at Statcan

Coldwell